Al-Jamiea Sport Club, is an Iraqi football team based in Baghdad, that plays in the Iraq Division Two.

Al-Talaba controversy
The club was founded by the former national team star Younis Mahmoud, and some fans of the Al-Talaba club considered that the establishment of the Al-Jamiea Club represents a coup against the Al-Talaba Club to dismantle it and rob its financial resources, because the two clubs belong to the same sponsor, the Ministry of Higher Education and Scientific Research, and because the name of the “Al-Jamiea” is the name of the team that previously merged with Al-Talaba club, but the Minister of Higher Education confirmed that there is no contemplation of dismantling the Al-Talaba club and the financial grant will be paid to it, and Younis Mahmoud stressed that the Al-Jamiea club relies on self-support.

See also
 Al-Talaba SC

References

External links
 Al-Jamiea SC on Goalzz.com
 Iraq Clubs- Foundation Dates

Football clubs in Iraq
Association football clubs established in 2020
2020 establishments in Iraq
Football clubs in Baghdad